Padman or Pad Man may refer to:

 Arunachalam Muruganantham (born 1962), Indian social entrepreneur, inventor of low-cost sanitary pads
 Pad Man (film), 2018 biographical comedy-drama made in India, based on Arunachalam Muruganantham
 Doug Padman (1885–1970), Australian politician
 Rachael Padman (born 1954), Australian physics lecturer at the University of Cambridge in England
 General Jonathan Krantz, nickname Pad Man, main antagonist in the  television series Prison Break

See also
 World of Padman (WoP), a video game